American Hoggers is an American reality television series on A&E that debuted October 19, 2011. The series chronicles the lives of the Campbell family whose family business is professional game hunting and animal control specifically the removal of feral hogs in the state of Texas. Season 4 premiered on October 22, 2013.

Synopsis
The show chronicles the day in the life of Brown County (about 100 miles north west of Austin) Texan Jerry Campbell and his family, as they struggle to control the explosive population growth of feral hogs in the state of Texas. Feral hogs are a growing problem because of their destructive feeding habits, potential to spread disease and increasing population. They can be dangerous and are able to cause serious harm and injury to humans and livestock.

Millions of dollars are lost by farmers and ranchers from the devastating chaos caused by these wild boars which has prompted the state of Texas to allow and sanction the practice of elimination without limits of the wild pigs. The goal is not eradication, which few believe possible, but control. As age and dwindling mobility continue to hit Jerry Campbell, Jerry attempts to slowly transition his children to taking over his role of company head.

Cast
 Jerry Dean Campbell – the patriarch of the Campbell family; has been hog hunting for over forty years; perfected his trade with the Department of Interior as a federal hunter, responsible for eliminating problem animals that were killing livestock; believes the old ways are the right ways; hopes to be the next wild hog sausage mogul
 Robert "Hunter" Campbell – the elder son; has spent years refining his hog hunting skills in effort to advance the company's profile; overzealous, hardheaded, and quick to quarrel with anyone differing in his view point
 Krystal "Pistol" Campbell – the youngest member of the Campbells; not a typical cowgirl; armed with her six-shooter, her hot pink chaps, and pink nails, this cowgirl isn't afraid to get dirty when it comes to proving herself; aspires to also take over the family business. Left with Penick to form Wild Women Hoggers, a rival hog hunting outlet after a fallout with Jerry Campbell.
 Lea Penick – family friend and "honorary member of the Campbell clan" as dubbed by Jerry; married rancher and seasoned hunter; competitive barrel racer, her horsemanship, assertiveness, and calmness is an asset to the Campbells' hog hunting business
 Kathie Campbell – the matriarch of the Campbell family; keeps every member of the family in check; acts as the bridge for the generational gap between Jerry and their kids
 The Dogs – the Walker hound, both purebred and mixed, are the typical dogs used by Jerry Campbell; they are a derivative of the American Foxhound; the lead dog (Rooster, who died in season 1, and Ranger) chaperone the pack (Creager, Doce, Griz, Jill, Lugnut, and Sparkplug), and the striker dog (Big'un, who is responsible for subduing the hog by attacking its ear) in search of the destructive hogs.
 Creek Boys – the rival hoggers to the Campbells led by West Virginia native Ronnie Creek as Hog Boss and co-owner of Tater Creek Outfitters. The Creek team consists of Texans Randy Tate (co owner of Tater Creek Outfitters), Dave "Shep" Shepperd and exterminator Cody Whitish.
 Katie Ball – a former bartender and fitness model from Central Texas, hired by Jerry in order to pick up the void left in his company when Krystal and Lea resigned. Jerry hopes to mentor her into becoming a hog hunter.

Episodes

Pilot episode (2011)

Season 1 (2011)

Season 2 (2012)

Season 3 (2013)

Season 4 (2013)

References

External links
 
 

2010s American reality television series
2011 American television series debuts
2013 American television series endings
Television series by Original Productions
A&E (TV network) original programming